IBM Software Group (SWG) was one of the major divisions of IBM. 
Since 2010, it was sub-divided into two groups: Middleware and Solutions

See List of IBM products#Computer software for a list of actual IBM software products.

Middleware Group
 Information Management Software — database servers and tools, text analytics, and content management.
 Rational Software — Software development and application lifecycle management. Acquired in 2002.
 Tivoli Software — Systems management. Acquired in 1995. Re-branded as 'Cloud & Smarter Infrastructure' (C&SI) in 2013. 
 WebSphere - An EJB development environment, container, and a series of pre-packaged applications, primarily for management interfaces and web commerce.

Solutions Group
 Lotus Software — Groupware, collaboration and business software. Acquired in 1995.
 Business Analytics — Cognos and SPSS
 Industry Solutions — Enterprise Content Management, Enterprise Marketing Management and B2B&Commerce

References 

Software Group (SWG)